Eric-Jan Wagenmakers (born May 21, 1972) is a Dutch mathematical psychologist. He is a professor at the Methodology Unit in the Department of Psychology at the University of Amsterdam (UvA). Since 2012, he has also been Professor of Neurocognitive Modeling: Interdisciplinary Integration at UvA's Faculty of Social and Behavioral Sciences. A noted expert on research methods in psychology, he has been highly critical of some dubious practices by his fellow psychologists, including Daryl Bem's research purporting to find support for the parapsychological concept of extrasensory perception, and the tendency for psychologists in general to favor the publication of studies with surprising, eye-catching results. He has also been actively addressing the replication crisis in psychology by helping to conduct a series of studies aimed at reproducing a 1988 study on the supposed effects of smiling on the perceived funniness of cartoons.

References

External links

Dutch psychologists
1972 births
Living people
Academic staff of the University of Amsterdam
People from Borsele
University of Groningen alumni
University of Amsterdam alumni
Bayesian statisticians
Fellows of the Association for Psychological Science
Dutch statisticians
Dutch mathematicians
Experimental psychologists
Quantitative psychologists